TEDxLima is an independent TEDx event held annually in Lima, Peru. Like other TEDx events, the event obtained a free license from TED to hold the conference, with organizers agreeing to follow certain principles.

History
TEDxLima was founded as an independent TEDx event.

2017
 Carol Hernandez
 Ricardo Morán
 Luciana Olivares
 Indyra Oropeza
 Anai Padilla
 Wendy Ramos
 Moisés Salazar
 Sergio Tenorio
 Bruno Villegas

2018
 Marco Carrasco
 Osvaldo Cattone
 Andrea De la Piedra
 Natsumi Fukuhara
 Max Hidalgo
 Milagros López Loli
 Deyvis Orosco
 Enzo Romero
 César Zevallos

See also
Culture of Peru

References

External links
 TEDxLima official site
 TED overview of the TEDx program

Lima
Events in Lima
Lima